Stare Truskolasy  is a village in the administrative district of Gmina Sokoły, within Wysokie Mazowieckie County, Podlaskie Voivodeship, in north-eastern Poland.

References

Stare Truskolasy
Łomża Governorate
Białystok Voivodeship (1919–1939)
Belastok Region